Lewis Alexander Brigham (January 2, 1831 in – February 19, 1885) was an American Republican Party politician who represented New Jersey's 7th congressional district in the United States House of Representatives from 1879 to 1881.

Early life and education
Brigham was born in New York Mills, New York, on January 2, 1831. He attended the district schools and Whitestown Seminary in Whitesboro, New York. He graduated from Hamilton College in 1849. He studied law, was admitted to the bar in 1855 and commenced practice in New York City.

He was superintendent of public schools, Bergen, New Jersey, from 1866–1870. He was a member of the board of police commissioners of Jersey City, New Jersey from 1874–1876, and was a member of the New Jersey General Assembly in 1877.

Congress
He was elected as a Republican to the Forty-sixth Congress, serving in office from March 4, 1879 – March 4, 1881, but was an unsuccessful candidate for reelection in 1880 to the Forty-eighth Congress.

After leaving Congress, he resumed the practice of law in New York City. He died in Jersey City on February 19, 1885, and was interred in Old Bergen Church Cemetery.

Notes

External links

Lewis Alexander Brigham at The Political Graveyard

1831 births
1885 deaths
Hamilton College (New York) alumni
Republican Party members of the New Jersey General Assembly
New Jersey lawyers
Politicians from Jersey City, New Jersey
People from New York Mills, New York
Republican Party members of the United States House of Representatives from New Jersey
Burials in New Jersey
19th-century American politicians
19th-century American lawyers